This is a list of media content related to Mount Everest, the Earth's highest mountain, with an elevation of  above sea level. Mount Everest was identified as such in the 19th century as a result of a geographical survey conducted by the British Empire. A century later it was climbed, after some infamous attempts in the preceding decades.

During the 20th and 21st centuries, the notoriety of Mount Everest increased and it became a common subject of novels and films, often focusing on particular expeditions or events at the mountain. For example, the 1998 film Everest was the highest grossing IMAX film up to that time, and some novels in the genre have sold millions of copies.

Books

Non-fiction

Fiction
Paths of Glory, Jeffrey Archer (2009)
Peak, Roland Smith (2007)
The Summit of the Gods (2000–2003 manga)
The Abominable, Dan Simmons (2013)

Film and television

Fiction/Dramatizations
Everest (2015)
Into Thin Air: Death on Everest (1997 TV movie)
Khangri: The Mountain  (1996 Nepalese film)
Lost on Everest (1998 TV episode)
Mallory's Tragedy on Mount Everest (1954 TV episode)
Miracle on Everest (2007)
Our Everest Challenge (TV movie)
Summit of Dreams (1998)
Storm Over Everest (2008 TV episode)
Monty Python's Flying Circus, "The All-England Summarize Proust Competition," the skit: "Everest Climbed by Hairdressers" (1972 TV episode)
The Climb (2017)
Touch the Top of the World (2006 TV movie)
Wings Over Everest (2019)

Other
Expedition Everest, a roller coaster at Disney's Animal Kingdom theme park in Florida, and the most expensive roller coaster ever built at the time
Mount Everest webcam, the world's highest live webcam, installed near the mountain in 2011
Everest, a 2000 computer game
Everest VR, a video game with virtual reality support based on the Unreal 4 game engine
Mount Everest, a board game

References

Mount Everest books from GoodReads

External links
List of books about Mount Everest by USA Today
More Everest books

Lists of books